John William Horan (May 13, 1908 – April 16, 1971) was a politician from Alberta, Canada. He served in the Legislative Assembly of Alberta from 1963 to 1971 as a member of the Social Credit Party.

Political career
Horan was first elected to the Alberta Legislature in the 1963 Alberta general election. He defeated Liberal candidate Keith Campbell and two other candidates in the electoral district of Edmonton Jasper Place. In the 1967 general election, he defeated Progressive Conservative candidate Gerard Amerongen and three other candidates to keep his seat.

References

External links
Legislative Assembly of Alberta Members Listing

1908 births
1971 deaths
Alberta Social Credit Party MLAs